Ian Holmes may refer to:

Ian Holmes (footballer, born 1950), midfielder for Sheffield United, York City, Huddersfield Town 
Ian Holmes (computational biologist), co-creator of the popular BBC Micro game Pipeline
Ian Holmes (footballer, born 1985), striker for Matlock Town, Mansfield Town and AFC Telford United
Ian Holmes (runner), English fell runner

See also
Ian Holm, actor